DH11500 was a series of 15 diesel-hydraulic shunter bought by the Turkish State Railways from Deutsche Bundesbahn in 1982. The units were all DB Class 211 built by Maschinenbau Kiel. Some units still remain in service with TCDD.

External links
 Trains of Turkey page on DH11500

MaK locomotives
B-B locomotives
Turkish State Railways diesel locomotives
Standard gauge locomotives of Turkey
Railway locomotives introduced in 1960